Jambugheh (also Romanized as Jambūgheh; also known as Jambū‘eh) is a village in Akhtachi Rural District, in the Central District of Bukan County, West Azerbaijan Province, Iran. At the 2006 census, its population was 514, in 71 families.

References 

Populated places in Bukan County